Cheyenne Cinnamon and the Fantabulous Unicorn of Sugar Town Candy Fudge (often shortened to Cheyenne Cinnamon), is an American animated television series pilot created by Dave Willis and Matt Harrigan; mainly produced by Williams Street it was animated by Radical Axis. Rated TV-MA, the pilot episode aired on Cartoon Network's late night programming block Adult Swim on March 29, 2010, but was not picked up for a full series.

Premise
Willis explained the plot as "a Strawberry Shortcake pop princess that lives in a candy wonderland just outside Detroit". She comes into Detroit and helps solve problems of racism and teen pregnancy "with the power of love and teen pop songs".

History and production
The pilot episode was first released in the United States, as part of the Adult Swim in a Box DVD box set on October 27, 2009. The pilot was later posted on Adultswim.com as part of an online poll entitled "Big, Uber Network Sampling" in early 2010
. The pilot episode eventually aired on television in the United States on Adult Swim on March 29, 2010.

The central joke of the series is a parody of how pop music sensations are often nothing like their public image: while Cheyenne outwardly projects the image of being a clean and wholesome role model, she is in fact a heavy abuser of drugs and is very promiscuous. For example, Cheyenne can magically transport people to her base of operations in a Candyland-like environment, but it turns out that the volcano that at first appears to be spewing sugar is in fact spewing cocaine, which Cheyenne snorts off-camera.

Alternative country singer Neko Case stars as Cheyenne Cinnamon but does not provide singing vocals. Instead, "her character will lip-synch, and then a decidedly different-sounding voice sings all the songs", according to Dave Willis. Rappers MF DOOM, MC Chris and T-Pain provide additional voices. References to the show, including brief clips from the pilot, have been featured in various episodes of Squidbillies, another Adult Swim program.

Willis mentioned on Twitter that the pilot was not picked up for a full series.

Characters
 Cheyenne Cinnamon (Neko Case) – A pop singer.
 Emily (Kristen Schaal) – A pregnant teenager.
 Gummi (MC Chris) – A talking gummi bear, who is associated with Cheyenne.
 Big Chocolate Bunny (MF Doom) – A big chocolate bunny.
 Gingerbread Bouncer (T-Pain) – A club bouncer.

Pilot episode

Home media
On October 27, 2009, Adult Swim, and distributor Warner Home Video, released "Adult Swim in a Box", a seven-disc DVD box set of a variety of different Adult Swim shows. Cheyenne Cinnamon and the Fantabulous Unicorn of Sugar Town Candy Fudge is featured in this set on a bonus DVD along with Korgoth of Barbaria, the pilot episode of Perfect Hair Forever, Totally for Teens, and Welcome to Eltingville; in June 2010, the bonus DVD, from "Adult Swim in a Box", was made available for separate purchase on Adultswimshop.com.

References

External links
 
 Interview about the show

2010 American television episodes
American adult animated comedy television series
American adult animated musical television series
Adult Swim pilots and specials
Television pilots not picked up as a series
Teenage pregnancy in television
Fictional singers
Television series created by Matt Harrigan
Television series created by Dave Willis